Anticholinergics (anticholinergic agents) are substances that block the action of the neurotransmitter called acetylcholine (ACh) at synapses in the central and peripheral nervous system.

These agents inhibit the parasympathetic nervous system by selectively blocking the binding of ACh to its receptor in nerve cells. The nerve fibers of the parasympathetic system are responsible for the involuntary movement of smooth muscles present in the gastrointestinal tract, urinary tract, lungs, sweat glands, and many other parts of the body.

In broad terms, anticholinergics are divided into two categories in accordance with their specific targets in the central and peripheral nervous system and at the neuromuscular junction: antimuscarinic agents, and antinicotinic agents (ganglionic blockers, neuromuscular blockers).

The term "anticholinergic" is typically used to refer to antimuscarinics which competitively inhibit the binding of ACh to muscarinic acetylcholine receptors; such agents do not antagonize the binding at nicotinic acetylcholine receptors at the neuromuscular junction, although the term is sometimes used to refer to agents which do so.

Medical uses
Anticholinergic drugs are used to treat a variety of conditions:
 Dizziness (including vertigo and motion sickness-related symptoms)
 Extrapyramidal symptoms, a potential side-effect of antipsychotic medications
 Gastrointestinal disorders (e.g., peptic ulcers, diarrhea, pylorospasm, diverticulitis, ulcerative colitis, nausea, and vomiting)
 Genitourinary disorders (e.g., cystitis, urethritis, and prostatitis)
 Insomnia, although usually only on a short-term basis
 Respiratory disorders (e.g., asthma, chronic bronchitis, and chronic obstructive pulmonary disease [COPD])
 Sinus bradycardia due to a hypersensitive vagus nerve
 Organophosphate based nerve agent poisoning, such as VX, sarin, tabun, and soman (atropine is favoured in conjunction with an oxime, usually pralidoxime)

Anticholinergics generally have antisialagogue effects (decreasing saliva production), and most produce some level of sedation, both being advantageous in surgical procedures.

Until the beginning of the 20th century anticholinergic drugs were widely used to treat psychiatric disorders.

Physiological effects
Delirium (often with hallucinations and delusions indistinguishable from reality)
Ocular symptoms (from eye drops): mydriasis, pupil dilation, and acute angle-closure glaucoma in those with shallow anterior chamber
Anhidrosis, dry mouth, dry skin
Fever
Constipation
Tachycardia
Urinary retention
Cutaneous vasodilation

Clinically the most significant feature is delirium, particularly in the elderly, who are most likely to be affected by the toxidrome.

Side effects
Long-term use may increase the risk of both cognitive and physical decline. It is unclear whether they affect the risk of death generally. However, in older adults they do appear to increase the risk of death.

Possible effects of anticholinergics include:

 Poor coordination
 Dementia
 Decreased mucus production in the nose and throat; consequent dry, sore throat
 Dry-mouth with possible acceleration of dental caries
 Cessation of sweating; consequent decreased epidermal thermal dissipation leading to warm, blotchy, or red skin
 Increased body temperature
 Pupil dilation; consequent sensitivity to bright light (photophobia)
 Loss of accommodation (loss of focusing ability, blurred vision – cycloplegia)
 Double-vision
 Increased heart rate
 Tendency to be easily startled
 Urinary retention
 Urinary incontinence while sleeping
 Diminished bowel movement, sometimes ileus (decreases motility via the vagus nerve)
 Increased intraocular pressure; dangerous for people with narrow-angle glaucoma

Possible effects in the central nervous system resemble those associated with delirium, and may include:

 Confusion
 Disorientation
 Agitation
 Euphoria or dysphoria
 Respiratory depression
 Memory problems
 Inability to concentrate
 Wandering thoughts; inability to sustain a train of thought
 Incoherent speech
 Irritability
 Mental confusion (brain fog)
 Wakeful myoclonic jerking
 Unusual sensitivity to sudden sounds
 Illogical thinking
 Photophobia
 Visual disturbances 
 Periodic flashes of light
 Periodic changes in visual field
Visual snow
 Restricted or "tunnel vision"
 Visual, auditory, or other sensory hallucinations
 Warping or waving of surfaces and edges
 Textured surfaces
 "Dancing" lines; "spiders", insects; form constants
 Lifelike objects indistinguishable from reality
 Phantom smoking 
 Hallucinated presence of people not actually there (i.e., the shadow people and/or the hat man.)
 Rarely: seizures, coma, and death
 Orthostatic hypotension (severe drop in systolic blood pressure when standing up suddenly) and significantly increased risk of falls in the elderly population.

Older patients are at a higher risk of experiencing CNS side effects.

Toxicity
An acute anticholinergic syndrome is reversible and subsides once all of the causative agents have been excreted. Reversible acetylcholinesterase inhibitor agents such as physostigmine can be used as an antidote in life-threatening cases. Wider use is discouraged due to the significant side effects related to cholinergic excess including seizures, muscle weakness, bradycardia, bronchoconstriction, lacrimation, salivation, bronchorrhea, vomiting, and diarrhea. Even in documented cases of anticholinergic toxicity, seizures have been reported after the rapid administration of physostigmine. Asystole has occurred after physostigmine administration for tricyclic antidepressant overdose, so a conduction delay (QRS > 0.10 second) or suggestion of tricyclic antidepressant ingestion is generally considered a contraindication to physostigmine administration.

Pharmacology
Anticholinergics are classified according to the receptors that are affected:
 Antimuscarinic agents operate on the muscarinic acetylcholine receptors. The majority of anticholinergic drugs are antimuscarinics.
 Antinicotinic agents operate on the nicotinic acetylcholine receptors. The majority of these are non-depolarising skeletal muscle relaxants for surgical use that are structurally related to curare. Several are depolarizing agents.

Examples
Examples of common anticholinergics:

 Antimuscarinic agents
 Antipsychotics (clozapine, quetiapine)
 Atropine
 Benztropine
 Biperiden
 Chlorpheniramine
 Certain SSRIs (Paroxetine)
 Dicyclomine (Dicycloverine)
 Dimenhydrinate 
 Diphenhydramine
 Doxepin
 Doxylamine 
 Flavoxate
 Glycopyrronium/-late 
 Hyoscyamine
 Ipratropium
 Orphenadrine 
 Oxitropium
 Oxybutynin
 Promethazine
 Propantheline bromide 
 Scopolamine
 Solifenacin
 Tolterodine
 Tiotropium 
 Tricyclic antidepressants (28 compounds with numerous trade names)
 Trihexyphenidyl
 Tropicamide
 Umeclidinium 
 Antinicotinic agents
 Bupropion – Ganglion blocker
 Dextromethorphan - Cough suppressant and ganglion blocker
 Doxacurium – Nondepolarizing skeletal muscular relaxant
 Hexamethonium – Ganglion blocker
 Mecamylamine – Ganglion blocker and occasional smoking cessation aid 
 Tubocurarine - Nondepolarizing skeletal muscular relaxant

Antidotes
Physostigmine is one of only a few drugs that can be used as an antidote for anticholinergic poisoning. Nicotine also counteracts anticholinergics by activating nicotinic acetylcholine receptors. Caffeine (although an adenosine receptor antagonist) can counteract the anticholinergic symptoms by reducing sedation and increasing acetylcholine activity, thereby causing alertness and arousal.

Psychoactive uses
When a significant amount of an anticholinergic is taken into the body, a toxic reaction known as acute anticholinergic syndrome may result. This may happen accidentally or intentionally as a consequence of either recreational or entheogenic drug use, though many users find the side effects to be exceedingly unpleasant and not worth the recreational effects they experience. In the context of recreational use, anticholinergics are often called deliriants.

Plant sources
The most common plants containing anticholinergic alkaloids (including atropine, scopolamine, and hyoscyamine among others) are:
Atropa belladonna (deadly nightshade)
Brugmansia species 
Datura species
Garrya species
Hyoscyamus niger (henbane)
Mandragora officinarum (mandrake)

Use as a deterrent
Several narcotic and opiate-containing drug preparations, such as those containing  hydrocodone and codeine are combined with an anticholinergic agent to deter intentional misuse. Examples include Hydromet/Hycodan (hydrocodone/homatropine), Lomotil (diphenoxylate/atropine) and Tussionex (hydrocodone polistirex/chlorpheniramine). However, it is noted that opioid/antihistamine combinations are used clinically for their synergistic effect in the management of pain and maintenance of dissociative anesthesia (sedation) in such preparations as Meprozine (meperidine/promethazine) and Diconal (dipipanone/cyclizine), which act as strong anticholinergic agents.

References

Medical mnemonics